Konstantina Strantzali (born 16 September 2001) is a Greek footballer who plays as a midfielder for PAOK and the Greece national team.

International career
Strantzali made her debut for the Greece national team on 27 October 2020, against Ukraine.

References

2001 births
Living people
Women's association football midfielders
Greek women's footballers
Greece women's international footballers
PAOK FC (women) players
21st-century Greek women